Mark Murphy may refer to:

Sports
Mark Murphy (ice hockey) (born 1976), American ice hockey player who plays for the DEG Metro Stars
Mark Murphy (safety, born 1955) (born 1955), retired American football player, now President and CEO of the Green Bay Packers
Mark Murphy (safety, born 1958) (born 1958), retired American football player
Mark Murphy (soccer) (born 1984), American soccer player

Other
Mark Murphy (singer) (1932–2015), American jazz singer
Mark Murphy (author), author and expert on organizational leadership and employee engagement

See also
Marc Murphy (footballer) (born 1987), Australian rules footballer
Marc Murphy (chef) (born c. 1969), Italian chef